The 2023 WNBA season will be the 26th season for the Phoenix Mercury of the Women's National Basketball Association, and the second season under Head Coach Vanessa Nygaard.

In October 2022, Skylar Diggins-Smith announced on Instagram that she was pregnant with her second child.

On December 8, 2022, Brittney Griner was successfully returned to the United States of America after the Brittney Griner–Viktor Bout prisoner exchange went through without issues. By extension, Griner returned to action with the Mercury and the WNBA after missing the entire 2022 WNBA season due to her being arrested and imprisoned in Russia (a place she had previously played in for years during the WNBA's offseasons by playing with the UMMC Ekaterinburg without prior issue) for medical cannabis, which is considered an illegal substance there. The Mercury later re-signed Griner to a new deal on February 17, 2023.

On December 20, 2022, Mercury team owner Robert Sarver agreed to a deal made by a new ownership group led by United Wholesale Mortgage's CEO Mat Ishbia and his older brother Justin Ishbia where Sarver would sell his majority shares of both the Mercury and Phoenix Suns to them under a joint deal worth a record-high $4 billion. This transition into new ownership was made during the month of September 2022 after an independent investigation led by the National Basketball Association revealed some ugly, disgusting behaviors he had throughout his ownership periods with both the Suns and Mercury, though primarily with the Suns. The NBA approved of the sale to the Ishbia brothers on February 6, 2023, with Sarver's transition out of ownership of both franchises being made official on February 7, 2023. Despite his removal from ownership, Sarver still had to serve his suspension for the 2023 WNBA season until at least September 13, 2023; he has since disputed that suspension claim because of his lack of team ownership.

Transactions

WNBA Draft

Transactions

Roster Changes

Additions

Subtractions

Roster

Schedule

Regular Season

|- 
| 1
| May 19
| @ Los Angeles
| 
| 
| 
| 
| Crypto.com Arena
| 
|- 
| 2
| May 21
| Chicago
| 
| 
| 
| 
| Footprint Center
| 
|- 
| 3
| May 25
| Minnesota
| 
| 
| 
| 
| Target Center
| 

|- 
| 4
| June 2
| Los Angeles
| 
| 
| 
| 
| Footprint Center
| 
|- 
| 5
| June 7
| @ Dallas
| 
| 
| 
| 
| College Park Center
| 
|- 
| 6
| June 9
| @ Dallas
| 
| 
| 
| 
| College Park Center
| 
|- 
| 7
| June 11
| @ Indiana
| 
| 
| 
| 
| Gainbridge Fieldhouse
| 
|- 
| 8
| June 13
| Seattle
| 
| 
| 
| 
| Footprint Center
| 
|- 
| 9
| June 16
| @ Washington
| 
| 
| 
| 
| Entertainment and Sports Arena
| 
|- 
| 10
| June 18
| @ New York
| 
| 
| 
| 
| Barclays Center
| 
|- 
| 11
| June 21
| Las Vegas
| 
| 
| 
| 
| Footprint Center
| 
|- 
| 12
| June 24
| @ Seattle
| 
| 
| 
| 
| Climate Pledge Arena
| 
|- 
| 13
| June 27
| Dallas
| 
| 
| 
| 
| College Park Center
|
|- 
| 14
| June 29
| Indiana
| 
| 
| 
| 
| Footprint Center
| 

|- 
| 15
| July 1
| Minnesota
| 
| 
| 
| 
| Footprint Center
| 
|- 
| 16
| July 5
| @ New York
| 
| 
| 
| 
| Barclays Center
| 
|- 
| 17
| July 7
| @ Minnesota
| 
| 
| 
| 
| Target Center
|
|- 
| 18
| July 9
| Los Angeles
| 
| 
| 
| 
| Footprint Center
| 
|- 
| 19
| July 11
| @ Las Vegas
| 
| 
| 
| 
| Michelob Ultra Arena
|
|- 
| 20
| July 18
| Connecticut
| 
| 
| 
| 
| Footprint Center
|
|- 
| 21
| July 20
| Chicago
| 
| 
| 
| 
| Footprint Center
|
|- 
| 22
| July 23
| @ Washington
| 
| 
| 
| 
| Entertainment and Sports Arena
|
|- 
| 23
| July 25
| @ Atlanta
| 
| 
| 
| 
| Gateway Center Arena
|
|- 
| 24
| July 30
| @ Chicago
| 
| 
| 
| 
| Wintrust Arena
|

|- 
| 25
| August 1
| @ Indiana
| 
| 
| 
| 
| Gainbridge Fieldhouse
|
|- 
| 26
| August 3
| Atlanta
| 
| 
| 
| 
| Footprint Center
|
|- 
| 27
| August 5
| Seattle
| 
| 
| 
| 
| Footprint Center
|
|- 
| 28
| August 8
| Washington
| 
| 
| 
| 
| Footprint Center
|
|- 
| 29
| August 10
| Connecticut
| 
| 
| 
| 
| Footprint Center
|
|- 
| 30
| August 13
| @ Seattle
| 
| 
| 
| 
| Climate Pledge Arena
|
|- 
| 31
| August 18
| New York
| 
| 
| 
| 
| Footprint Center
|
|- 
| 32
| August 20
| Indiana
| 
| 
| 
| 
| Footprint Center
|
|- 
| 33
| August 22
| @ Los Angeles
| 
| 
| 
| 
| Crypto.com Arena
|
|- 
| 34
| August 27
| Dallas
| 
| 
| 
| 
| Footprint Center
|
|- 
| 35
| August 29
| @ Atlanta
| 
| 
| 
| 
| Gateway Center Arena
|
|- 
| 36
| August 31
| @ Connecticut
| 
| 
| 
| 
| Mohegan Sun Arena
|

|- 
| 37
| September 3
| @ Minnesota
| 
| 
| 
| 
| Target Center
|
|- 
| 38
| September 5
| Washington
| 
| 
| 
| 
| Footprint Center
|
|- 
| 39
| September 8
| Las Vegas
| 
| 
| 
| 
| Footprint Center
|
|- 
| 40
| September 10
| @ Las Vegas
| 
| 
| 
| 
| T-Mobile Arena
|
|-

Standings

Statistics

Regular Season

Awards and Honors

References

External links

Phoenix Mercury seasons
Phoenix Mercury
Phoenix Mercury